HOSxP is a hospital information system, including Electronic health record (EHR), used in hospitals across Thailand. It serves over 300 hospitals in Thailand. The software aims to ease the healthcare workflow of health centers, for small sanatoriums to central hospitals.

Before becoming HOSxP, the software was called KSK-HDBMS. Seeking a more friendly name, the development team opted for the name HOSxP, which comes from Hospital and Experience. The name also reflects the software's graphical user interface, which mimic the theme of Windows XP, no matter what actually the underlying operating system.

Distributed under GNU General Public License (GPL), HOSxP is free software in HOSxP-PCU (HOSxP Version for Primary Health Care Unit) and yearly subscription in HOSxP & HOSxP XE (HOSxP Version 4).

History 

The development started in 1999. Emerged from a solo project by Chaiyaporn Suratemekul, a pharmacist by training, and the main developers of the software are staffs from Bangkok Medical Software Co., Ltd., a company led by Chaiyaporn. The development infrastructure, including source code repository.

in 2012 BMS has announcement the HOSxP changed update download from Free Download to Yearly Subscription Update since HOSxP V.3.55.8.15 but no effect for HOSxP PCU.

in 2015 BMS has announcement the HOSxP XE (HOSxP v4), announcement HOSxP V.3 nearby End of Life and improve HOSxP XE PCU to Yearly Subscription Update.

Architecture and technical information 
HOSxP uses a client–server architecture. For the database server, it is claimed to run on many RDBMS, like MySQL, Microsoft SQL Server, PostgreSQL, and Interbase/Firebird.

It uses a two-tier Client–server  architecture with server software running on either Linux or Microsoft Windows and client software can run only on Microsoft Windows.
It implements Distributed Component Object Model (DCOM) and uses Multi-tier technology based on Borland DataSnap.

Borland Delphi and its Linux counterpart Kylix are the integrated development environments of choice in the project.

A user is allowed to write scripts in the Pascal programming language to automate tasks in HOSxP.

See also 

 List of open source healthcare software
 Hospital OS

References

External links 
 
 

Free health care software
Free software programmed in Delphi
Electronic health record software
Information technology in Thailand
Pascal (programming language) software